Eryngium yuccifolium, known as rattlesnake master, button eryngo, and button snake-root, is a perennial herb of the parsley family native to the tallgrass prairies of central and eastern North America. It grows from Minnesota east to Ohio and south to Texas and Florida, including a few spots in Connecticut, New Jersey, Maryland, and Delaware.

Name
The common name "rattlesnake master" is attributed to early European pioneers erroneously believing the plant to be an antidote for rattlesnake venom based upon Native Americans' various medicinal uses of the plant.  The species name yuccifolium "yucca-leaved" was given because its leaves resemble those of yuccas.

Description
They are bluish-green, and covered in a waxy coating. On the edges are regularly spaced bristles or spines. The root system consists of a central taproot surrounded by thick fleshy fibrous roots.

Individual flowers in the umbels are small, 3–4 mm in diameter, with greenish-white or bluish-white petals and a faint honey-like scent. Underneath each flower is a spiny green bract, and underneath each flower cluster is a small star-like rosette of spiny bracts. The flowers are produced in July and August.

After the flowerbuds open, the pollen matures and is released two to three days before the stigmas become receptive. This encourages cross-pollination by making it unlikely that a given flower's pollen will fertilize the stigma of the same flower. Rattlesnake master has unusually high seed set (close to 90%).

Ecology
In remnant natural areas, Eryngium yuccifolium is fairly intolerant of anthropogenic disturbance. It readily establishes when planted in prairie restorations.

The flowers attract many insects, including short and long-tongued bees, flies, beetles, and butterflies, but most numerous of all are wasps. It is a larval host to the rattlesnake-master borer moth (Papaipema eryngii).

Cultivation

It is sold by native plant nurseries for prairie or native meadow restoration and for gardens and landscapes. It does best with full sun and well-drained soil. Slightly acidic to slightly alkaline soil reaction (pH) is best. It can die from root rot if the soil stays wet or moist for too long. Once planted it is best left undisturbed and never dug up and reset as with many perennials because it develops a large taproot and other thick, fleshy roots. It often self-sows a little to a good amount in gardens. When planted from seed, a period of cold-moist stratification is required.

Uses
Fibers of rattlesnake master have been found as one of the primary materials used in the ancient shoe construction of midwestern Native Americans.

References

yuccifolium
Endemic flora of the United States
Taxa named by André Michaux
Flora without expected TNC conservation status